Driskill may refer to:

People
Clive Driskill-Smith (b. 1978), English organist
Hope Driskill (b. ?), a contestant on the 2013 American television series Survivor: Caramoan
Jeff Driskill (b. ? ), American football coach
Ogden Driskill (b. ? ), American politician in Wyoming
Travis Driskill (b. 1971), American baseball player 
Walter Driskill (1913 – 1998), American football coach

Other
 The Driskill Hotel, a building in Austin, Texas, United States
 Driskill Mountain, a mountain in Louisiana, United States

See also
Driscoll (disambiguation)